Clifford Swindell Malone (September 4, 1925 — October 8, 2008) was a Canadian professional ice hockey forward who played 3 games in the National Hockey League (NHL) for the Montreal Canadiens during the 1951–52 season, recording no points. The rest of his career, which lasted from 1944 to 1954, was mainly spent in the Quebec Senior Hockey League. He was the nephew of Hockey Hall of Famer Joe Malone.

He died on October 8, 2008 in Toronto.

Career statistics

Regular season and playoffs

References

External links
 

1925 births
2008 deaths
Canadian ice hockey forwards
Ice hockey people from Quebec City
Montreal Canadiens players
Montreal Royals (QSHL) players